The 1914–15 Loyola Ramblers men's basketball team represents Loyola University Chicago during the 1914–15 college men's basketball season. The team finished the season with an overall record of 8–3.

Schedule

|-

References

Loyola Ramblers men's basketball seasons
Loyola Ramblers
Loyola Ramblers
Loyola Ramblers